The 2012 AFC Annual Awards was the top football players and coaches of the year in Asia.

Among five candidates, Lee Keun-Ho win the Asian Footballer of the Year award for his role in winning AFC Champions League for his club team.

Aya Miyama, Japan women's football team player which won 2011 FIFA Women's World Cup was awarded Asian Women Footballer of the Year for the second time in a row.

Hanae Shibata and Mohannad Abdul-Raheem becomes the Youth Player of the Year. Ulsan Hyundai which won 2012 AFC Champions League was named as the Club of the Year. Both Japan and South Korea's Olympic teams was named as women's and men's team was named as National Team of the Year.

Yuichi Nishimura and Sachiko Yamagishi were named as men's referee of the year. Kim Ho-Kon was awarded as the Coach of the Year. Rafael Henmi was awarded as Futsal Player of the Year. Giti Pasand, winner of the 2012 AFC Futsal Club Championship was named as Futsal Club of the Year. Fair Play Award was given to the Uzbekistan national football team. Football Federation of Iran was awarded as the Best Football Federation in Asia.

Winners

Men

Asian Footballer of the Year

International players

Foreign players

Coach of the year

National team of the year

Club of the year

Women

Young Player

Futsal Player

See also 
 Asian Footballer of the Year
 Asian Young Footballer of the Year

References

External links 
 Official page

Asian Football Confederation trophies and awards
AFC Annual Award, 2012